Lex Aelia Sentia was a law established in ancient Rome in 4 AD. It was one of the laws that the Roman assemblies had to pass (after they were asked to do so by emperor Augustus). This law (as well as Lex Fufia Caninia), has made limitations on manumissions. Manumission, or the freeing of a slave, became increasingly important by the early empire. Augustus sought to enact a series of restrictions on the practice. This law stated that for a manumission to be valid a master had to be at least twenty years old and a slave at least thirty. These limitations on manumissions were made when the number of manumissions were so large (at the end of Republic and the beginning of Empire), that they even questioned the social system of the time.

This law had several provisions. One such provision stated that certain slaves who were manumitted could not become full Roman citizens, but rather would become members of a lower class of freedmen (Peregrini dediticii). If a manumitted slave was under age thirty, he could only achieve full citizenship after a legal proceeding (a consilia) similar to a family law trial. These legal proceedings were to be held at pre-determined times in the provinces and in Rome. Any slave under the age of thirty could achieve full citizenship rights without the need for a consilia if his master was insolvent and agreed to free him. If a slave was freed under the age of thirty, but was not granted full citizenship rights upon his manumission, he could be granted those full citizenship rights if he married a Roman freedwoman or freewoman, and had with this woman a child who was, at the time, at least one year of age. If he could prove this to a magistrate or governor, he, his wife, and his child, would all become full citizens. If the father had died before this had occurred, the mother could accomplish the same result. This provision was inserted by Augustus to increase the rate of marriage and childbirth, which, at the time, were both in decline. Augustus also believed that public morals were in a state of decline during his reign, and so by encouraging marriage especially, Augustus was attempting to "restore" the degree of virtue that he believed had existed under the Republic.

If a master manumitted his slave in order to defraud his creditors (slaves could be pledged as collateral), the manumission was invalid. A person under the age of twenty could only manumit a slave if he went through the ordinary legal proceeding (consilium). This provision, and several other provisions did not apply to slaves who had been given membership in certain lower classes of freedmen. These classes were included in these provisions, however, upon a decree of the senate during the reign of the emperor Hadrian. By the time of the late empire, this law had little importance. This law was passed by virtue of the constitutional forms at the time of Augustus, when the status of a Civis had not yet lost its value, and a semblance of the Constitution of the Roman Republic still existed.

See also
Roman Law
Status in Roman legal system
List of Roman laws

Notes

External links
The Roman Law Library, incl. Leges

Roman law
1st century in law